Sunday League – Pepik Hnatek's Final Match is a 2012 Czech comedy film directed by Jan Prušinovský.

Cast 
 Miroslav Krobot as Pepik Hnátek
 Ondřej Vetchý as Jirka Luňák
 David Novotný as Jarda Kužel
 Jaroslav Plesl as Lojza
 Luděk Sobota as Václav Orel
 Jaroslava Pokorná as Antonie Hnátková

References

External links 

2012 comedy films
2012 films
Czech Lion Awards winners (films)
Czech Film Critics' Awards winners
Czech comedy films
Czech prequel films